Hrebienok is a small ski resort in the Tatra Mountains, in northern Slovakia. It is connected by the Starý Smokovec–Hrebienok funicular to the town of Starý Smokovec, which is in turn part of the Tatra Electric Railway.

Sources

http://hrebienok.slovakian-mountains.eu/

Tourism in Slovakia